Concentric Circles is the third album (but second released) by jazz saxophonist Chris Potter, recorded in 1993 and released by Concord in 1994. It features Potter with pianist Kenny Werner, electric guitarist John Handy, bassist Scott Colley and drummer Bill Stewart.

Reception

The AllMusic review by Scott Yanow states "Only 23 at the time of this Concord CD, Chris Potter shows a great deal of originality in his explorative styles on alto and soprano ... All but two songs on this set are his originals and on some pieces Potter utilizes some overdubbing. Essentially a quintet session, this CD also contains some fine chance-taking solos from pianist Kenny Werner and guitarist John Hart, with the music ranging from modal to free bop".

Track listing
All compositions by Chris Potter except where noted
 "El Morocco" − 8:50
 "Klee" − 5:43
 "Blues in Concentric Circles" − 10:12	
 "Dusk" − 4:46
 "Lonely Moon" − 7:02	
 "You and the Night and the Music" (Arthur Schwartz, Howard Dietz) − 7:15
 "Mortal Coils" − 7:17
 "In a Sentimental Mood" (Duke Ellington, Manny Kurtz, Irving Mills) − 8:40
 "Aurora" − 5:55

Personnel
Chris Potter –  tenor saxophone, alto saxophone, soprano saxophone, alto flute, bass clarinet
Kenny Werner − piano
John Hart − guitar
Scott Colley − double bass
Bill Stewart – drums

References

Chris Potter (jazz saxophonist) albums
1994 albums
Concord Records albums